Wissinoming was a SEPTA Regional Rail station in Philadelphia, Pennsylvania. Located on Amtrak's Northeast Corridor, it was served by Trenton Line commuter trains. It was located off Comly Street in the neighborhood of Wissinoming.

SEPTA discontinued service to Wissinoming on November 9, 2003, citing low ridership; 25 people were boarding at the station every day. SEPTA had previously attempted to close the station in 1994, but a strong response from the Wissinoming Civic Association won the station a reprieve.

References 

Former SEPTA Regional Rail stations
Former Pennsylvania Railroad stations
Railway stations closed in 2003
Railway stations in Philadelphia
Stations on the Northeast Corridor
2003 disestablishments in Pennsylvania